Sandefjord Fotball, commonly known simply as Sandefjord, is a Norwegian professional football club, founded on 10 September 1998. The club currently competes in Eliteserien, the top tier of the Norwegian football league system. Their home ground is the Release Arena, located in Sandefjord, Vestfold.

The club reached 1. divisjon in 1999, where they made quick progress and soon settled as strong competitors for promotion to the top division. Finishing third in 1. divisjon both in 2002 and 2003 they qualified for play-off matches, but lost both times. In 2004 they finished fourth. In 2005 season they placed second and earned automatic promotion to highest division.

The club, in their first Tippeligaen season, finished ninth in the table and reached the cup final. In 2007 they finished last and were relegated to 1. divisjon.

In the 2008 season in 1. divisjon, Sandefjord recovered from a poor start to finish second and qualify for automatic promotion to Tippeligaen. In the 2009 season Sandefjord finished eighth, their strongest performance in the top flight to date. In 2010 Sandefjord were relegated to 1. divisjon. They won 1. divisjon title in 2014, earning promotion back to Tippeligaen. They were relegated in the 2015 season, but were then promoted in 2016. Their spell in the top flight would last two seasons on this occasion. However, the club was to again win promotion after spending the 2019 season in 1. divisjon.

History 
Sandefjord were formed by parent clubs IL Runar and Sandefjord Ballklubb in 1998. They replaced Sandefjord Ballklubb in 2. divisjon in 1999, and secured immediate promotion to 1st division. There the club made quick progress and soon settled as a strong competitor for promotion to the Tippeligaen. Finishing third in 1. divisjon in 2002 and 2003 they qualified for play-off matches, but lost both times, against Brann and Vålerenga. The 2003 play-off was lost after some controversial decisions by referee Jonny Ditlefsen that were all in Sandefjords disfavor. When manager Tom Nordlie left after the play-off games, Sandefjord Fotball hired Arne Dokken as their new coach. He was fired after just one season, 2004, when they finished fourth. But the 2005 season finally proved a success, with Tor Thodesen as their new coach. Placing second, Sandefjord earned automatic promotion to the highest division, where they finished 9th in their first season.

The 2007 season ended badly and they finished last and were relegated to 1. divisjon. The players went to the board of directors together and requested the hiring of a new coach. Instead of firing Thodesen, the board kept him. After a bad start to the 2008 season, they fired Thodesen and hired Patrick Walker. The team played better after this, and he moved the team from a relegation place to a promotion place in the table in eight games. They continued their form and was placed second in the table, and earned a promotion after just one season.

After a disappointing 2010 season in Tippeligaen, earning only 12 points, they ended the season in last place and was relegated once again, this time for a longer period.

The following three seasons in 1. divisjon did not go as planned for a Sandefjord team that were fighting for promotion. Ending third in the table in both 2011 and 2012, was followed by an even worse finish in 2013, ending in eight place. Something had to be done and the club took measures by firing manager Arne Sandstø and hiring former Nottingham Forest and Blackburn Rovers player Lars Bohinen as their new manager. He was brought to the club from Asker where he had success as coach. Sandefjord went on to have their best season ever in 1. divisjon earning 69 points and winning the league title. This was their second ever trophy, the first one being the 2. divisjon in 1999. Back in Tippeligaen they ended in last place and were relegated back to 1. divisjon alongside Mjøndalen. In the 2016 season they clinched their second promotion in three years by finishing second, only beaten by Kristiansund.

Colours and badge 

Sandefjord Fotball's colours are blue. They play in blue shirts, blue shorts and white socks. When the club was formed in 1998, it was decided that the new club would have different colours from its parent clubs Sandefjord BK (yellow and black) and Runar (white). The club changed their badge before the start of the 2006 season. This was mainly for press purposes. The old badge had a yellow field as well as the blue and red. The new badge only has the colours red and blue. Further on, the white whale tail on the badge links to Sandefjord city's whaling history. After the promotion in 2014, Sandefjord played one season in an alternate home kit which consisted of half blue and half red, as in their badge. Relegated to 1. divisjon in 2016, they were back playing in an all blue home kit again.

Stadium 

 Sandefjord Fotball play their home games at Sandefjord Arena, previously called Komplett.no Arena and Komplett Arena due to sponsorship deals. This is an all modern stadium, with a capacity of about 6,582. Record attendance was set during the opening game versus Lyn on July 21, 2007. 8,103 people attended this game. In the future it is planned to expand the stadium to a capacity of 8 000. Field measurements are 105 x 68 meters.

Before Sandefjord Fotball started to use their new home arena, Release Arena, they used to play their home encounters at Storstadion. Sandefjord Fotball played their home games at Storstadion from 1999 to 2007. As the stadium itself did not live up to the standards one could expect from a modern football stadium, it was finally decided to build the new and modern Release Arena and start a new and exciting chapter in the young club's history.

Honours 
1. divisjon:
Winners (1): 2014
Runners-up (4): 2005, 2008, 2016, 2019
2. divisjon:
Winners (1): 1999
Norwegian Cup:
Runners-up (1): 2006

Recent history

Current squad

Out on loan

Management

Key people

Coaching staff

Manager history

References

External links 

 (in Norwegian)
Blåhvalane (English: The Blue Whales) – Official fanclub

 
Football clubs in Norway
Association football clubs established in 1998
1998 establishments in Norway
Eliteserien clubs
Sport in Vestfold og Telemark
Sandefjord
Companies based in Sandefjord